Girls with Guns is the debut solo album from Styx guitarist/vocalist Tommy Shaw. It was released in October 1984 by A&M Records.

The title track was a top 10 hit on rock radio, peaking at #6 on the Billboard Mainstream Rock Tracks chart and reaching a high of #33 on the Billboard Hot 100. "Girls with Guns" was featured in the first season of the Miami Vice episode "Glades".

A second single, the ballad "Lonely School", was released in late 1984 and peaked at #60 on the Hot 100 in January 1985. The videos for both singles received premiere status and strong rotation on MTV, and the network aired a concert special featuring Shaw.

The CD and cassette formats of the album feature extended versions of the ballad "Kiss Me Hello" and the dance-rock track "Outside in the Rain".

The Girls with Guns album charted on the Billboard 200 chart for 25 weeks, peaking at #50.

Track listing
All words & music by Tommy Shaw except as noted.
 "Girls with Guns"  – 3:11
 "Come In and Explain"  – 4:20
 "Lonely School"  – 5:03
 "Heads Up" (Tommy Shaw, Eddie Wohlford, Kenny Loggins)  – 4:42
 "Kiss Me Hello"  – 5:37 [vinyl]; 7:47 [CD/cassette extended version]
 "Fading Away"  – 4:03
 "Little Girl World"  – 3:32
 "Outside in the Rain"  – 4:32 [vinyl]; 5:59 [CD/cassette extended version]
 "Free to Love You" (Shaw, Wohlford)  – 4:49
 "The Race Is On" (Shaw, Wohlford)  – 5:27

Personnel
Tommy Shaw – six and twelve-string electric guitar, mandolin, acoustic guitar, lead vocals
Steve Holley – drums, percussion
Brian Stanley – bass guitar
Peter Wood – piano, electric piano, synthesizer
Richie Cannata – saxophone solo on "The Race Is On"
Molly Duncan – saxophone section on "The Race Is On"
Carol Kenyon – duet vocal on "Outside in the Rain"
Jimbo Jones & Eddie Wohlford - backing vocals on "Outside in the Rain"
Produced by Mike Stone for Mike Stone Ltd.

Drummer Steve Holley had played in Paul McCartney's band, Wings. He and bassist Brian Stanley would go on to become the rhythm section of Jules Shear's 1988 band project, Reckless Sleepers. Keyboard player Peter Wood played with Al Stewart and also served as the surrogate version of Rick Wright in the 1980 and 1981 performances of Pink Floyd's The Wall.

Notes 

1984 debut albums
Tommy Shaw albums
Albums produced by Mike Stone (record producer)
A&M Records albums